The 2015 Mendip District Council election took place on 7 May 2015 to elect members of Mendip District Council in England. This was the same day as other local elections and the general election to the House of Commons of the United Kingdom. As Mendip District councillors are elected on a 4-year term, the next election is due to take place in May 2019.

Election results

Ward results
The ward results listed below are based on the changes from the 2011 elections not taking into account any party defections or by-elections. Sitting councillors are marked with an asterisk (*).

Ammerdown

Ashwick, Chilcompton and Stratton

Beckington and Selwood

Butleigh and Baltonsborough

Chewton Mendip and Ston Easton

Coleford and Holcombe

Cranmore, Doulting and Nunney

Creech

Croscombe and Pilton

Frome Berkley Down

Adrian Dobinson was elected as a Liberal Democrat in 2011

Frome College

Frome Keyford

Frome Market

Frome Oakfield

Frome Park

Sharon Snook and Derek Tanswell were both elected in the Frome Market ward as Liberal Democrats in 2011

Glastonbury St Benedict's

Glastonbury St Edmund's

Glastonbury St John's

Glastonbury St Mary's

Moor

Postlebury

Rode and Norton St. Philip

Rodney and Westbury

Shepton East

Shepton West

St Cuthbert Out North

Street North

Street South

Street West

The Pennards and Ditcheat

Wells Central

Wells St Cuthbert's

Wells St Thomas'

Wookey and St Cuthbert Out West

References 

2015 English local elections
May 2015 events in the United Kingdom
2015
2010s in Somerset